Return to Tyassi is a 1950 play by the British writer Benn Levy. The plot concerns a woman with a shady past who attempts to redeem herself. Levy directed the play, which featured his wife Constance Cummings in the lead role.

It premiered at the Theatre Royal, Brighton before transferring to the Duke of York's Theatre in London's West End where it ran for 29 performances between 29 November and 23 December 1950. The original cast included Constance Cummings, Alexander Knox, Helen Haye and  John Justin. Poorly received, it was noted "some critics have knocked this play about severely, and may have done it irreparable damage".

References

Bibliography
 Wearing, J.P. The London Stage 1950-1959: A Calendar of Productions, Performers, and Personnel.  Rowman & Littlefield, 2014.

1950 plays
West End plays
Plays by Benn Levy
Plays set in London